Gürgenli is a village in the Gerger District, Adıyaman Province, Turkey. The village is populated by Kurds of the Mirdêsî tribe and had a population of 515 in 2021.

The hamlets of Akmeşe, Mezraa, Özveren and Sarıtarla are attached to Gürgenli.

References

Villages in Gerger District

Kurdish settlements in Adıyaman Province